Kabin Buri railway station is a railway station in Kabin Subdistrict, Kabin Buri District, Prachinburi, Thailand. Kabin Buri Station opened in January 1925 as part of the Eastern Line Chachoengsao Junction-Kabin Buri section. In November 1926, the line extended to Aranyaprathet. There was once a railway turntable on site, but it has been converted into a park.

Train services 
 Ordinary train No. 275/276 Bangkok – Aranyaprathet – Bangkok
 Ordinary train No. 277/278 Bangkok – Kabin Buri – Bangkok
 Ordinary train No. 279/280 Bangkok – Aranyaprathet – Bangkok
 Ordinary train No. 281/282 Bangkok – Kabin Buri – Bangkok

References 
  (Okamoto Kazuyuki (1993). Railway Travel in Thailand. Mekon. .)
  (Ichiro Kakizaki (2010). History of Railways in the Kingdom of Thailand. Kyoto University Academic Press. .)
  (Hiroshi Watanabe (2013). Travel of 4000 km of Thai National Railways. Literary company.)

Railway stations in Thailand
Railway stations opened in 1925